The 2017 Alya Malaysian Open was a women's tennis tournament played on outdoor hard courts. It was the 8th edition of the Malaysian Open and an International tournament on the 2017 WTA Tour. The tournament took place from 27 February to 5 March 2017 at the Kuala Lumpur Golf & Country Club (KLGCC).

Points and prize money distribution

Points distribution

Prize money

Singles main-draw entrants

Seeds

1 Rankings as of February 20, 2017.

Other entrants 
The following players received wildcards into the singles main draw:
  Zarina Diyas 
  Katarina Zavatska
  Zheng Saisai

The following players received entry from the qualifying draw:
  Ashleigh Barty
  Jang Su-jeong
  Anna Kalinskaya
  Miyu Kato
  Lesley Kerkhove
  Sabina Sharipova

Withdrawals 
Before the tournament
  Sorana Cîrstea →replaced by  Zhu Lin
  Vania King →replaced by  Sílvia Soler Espinosa
  Karin Knapp →replaced by  Sara Sorribes Tormo
  Kurumi Nara →replaced by  Nina Stojanović
  Yulia Putintseva →replaced by  Maryna Zanevska
  Evgeniya Rodina →replaced by  Aleksandra Krunić
  Maria Sakkari →replaced by  Zhang Kailin

During the tournament
  Elina Svitolina (left lower leg injury)

Retirements 
  Peng Shuai

Doubles main-draw entrants

Seeds 

Rankings as of February 20, 2017.

Other entrants 
The following pair received wildcard into the doubles main draw:
  Beatrice Gumulya  /  Theiviya Selvarajoo
  Jawairiah Noordin  /  Jessy Rompies

Finals

Singles 

  Ashleigh Barty defeated  Nao Hibino, 6–3, 6–2

Doubles 

  Ashleigh Barty /  Casey Dellacqua defeated  Nicole Melichar /  Makoto Ninomiya, 7–6(7–5), 6–3

References

External links
 Official website

Malaysian Open
Malaysian Open (tennis)
2017 in Malaysian tennis